Naam is a 1986 Indian Hindi-language crime thriller film directed by Mahesh Bhatt, starring Nutan, Kumar Gaurav, Sanjay Dutt, Poonam Dhillon, Amrita Singh and Paresh Rawal. The film is regarded a milestone in the careers of Mahesh Bhatt, Paresh Rawal and Sanjay Dutt. Naam proved to be a blockbuster at the Indian box office, playing for over a year at a majority of India's cinemas and stands as the eighth-highest-grossing Hindi film of the 1980s decade grossing . The soundtrack for the movie also contributed to its huge success. "Chithi Aayi Hai" (The letter has arrived) was selected as one of the 100 songs of the millennium by BBC Radio worldwide.

Synopsis

Janki Kapoor and her two sons Ravi Kapoor and Vicky Kapoor, come from a poor family, and have difficulties making ends meet.

To add to this burden, the family has to consider the waywardness of Vicky, who is always getting into trouble with the law. Ravi, on the other hand, is a hard-working, responsible son who earns for the family, but also makes sacrifices for Vicky. Vicky is determined to get a job in Hong Kong as he has heard of thousands of Indians making a successful living there.

Ravi arranges for Vicky's visa and the money to go to Hong Kong. Once in Dubai, the Kapoors receive no word from him. Vicky has encountered problems in Hong Kong, as he was cheated out of a job, and his visa was obtained fraudulently. In order to remain in Hong Kong
, he must work for ruthless international smuggler Rana, and must earn his keep or be turned over to the authorities, which eventually leads to Vicky's death by Police with Ravi watching and brothers consoling each other while the film ends.

Awards 
Bhatt and Dutt were both lauded as award favorites by many critics upon release of the film, but unfortunately, neither could be awarded any that year since no award ceremony took place in 1987 and 1988 due to security and technical issues.

Cast
 Nutan as Janki Kapoor
 Kumar Gaurav as Ravi Kapoor
 Sanjay Dutt as Vicky Kapoor
 Poonam Dhillon as Seema Rai
 Amrita Singh as Rita
 Paresh Rawal as Rana
 Rakesh Roshan as himself in a guest appearance
 Akash Khurana as Aftab Ahmed 
 Ram Mohan as Babu Pakett
 Ashutosh Gowariker as Jai Singh Kalewar, a taxi driver
 Mohan Sherry as Narayan 
 Purnima as Ravi and Vicky's grandmother 
Gurbachan Singh as Narayan's man
 Ghanshyam Rohera as Mr. Ghanshyam
 Shehnaz Anand as Mrs. Neetu Ghanshyam
 Rita Rani Kaul as Mrs. Saira A. Ahmed

Soundtrack
All the songs are written by lyricist Anand Bakshi and music by Laxmikant Pyarelal

Track listing

References

External links
 

1980s Hindi-language films
1980s crime thriller films
1980s crime action films
1986 crime drama films
1980s thriller drama films
1980s action drama films
1986 action thriller films
Films directed by Mahesh Bhatt
Films scored by Laxmikant–Pyarelal
1986 films
Films set in Dubai
Indian crime thriller films
Indian crime action films
Indian crime drama films
Indian thriller drama films
Indian action drama films
Indian action thriller films
1980s masala films